Arcangelo Corelli (also , , ; 17 February 1653 – 8 January 1713) was an Italian composer and violinist of the Baroque era. His music was key in the development of the modern genres of sonata and concerto, in establishing the preeminence of the violin, and as the first coalescing of modern tonality and functional harmony.

He was trained in Bologna and Rome and spent most of his career there with the protection of wealthy patrons. Though his entire production is limited to just six published collections — five of which are Trio Sonatas or solo and one by Concerti grossi — he achieved great fame and success throughout Europe, in the process crystallizing widely influential musical models.

His writing was admired for its balance, refinement, sumptuous and original harmonies, for the richness of the textures, for the majestic effect of the theatricality and for its clear, expressive and melodious polyphony, a perfect quality of classical ideals, although belonging to the baroque epoch and often employing resources typical of this school, such as the exploration of dynamic and expressive contrasts, but always tempered by a great sense of moderation. He was the first to fully apply, with an expressive and structuring purpose, the new tonal system, consolidated after at least two hundred years of experimentation. As a virtuoso violinist he was considered one of the greatest of his generation and contributed, thanks to the development of modern playing techniques and to his many disciples scattered throughout Europe, to place the violin among the most prestigious solo instruments and was also a significant figure in the evolution of the traditional orchestra.

A dominant figure in Roman musical life and internationally highly regarded, he was desired by many courts and was included in the most prestigious artistic and intellectual society of his time, the Pontifical Academy of Arcadia. He was known in his time as "the new Orpheus", "the prince of musicians" and other similar adjectives, great folklore was generated around his figure and his fame did not diminish after his death. Even today his work is the subject of a voluminous critical bibliography and his sonatas are still widely used in musical academies as didactic material as well as pieces capable of affirming themselves in today's concert repertoire. His position in the history of Western music is considered crucial, being recognized as one of the greatest masters at the turn of the XVII and XVIII century, as well as one of the earliest and greatest classicists.

Life

Childhood
Baptismal records indicate that Corelli was born on 17 February 1653 in the small Romagna town of Fusignano, then in the diocese of Ferrara, in the Papal States. His ancestors had been in Fusignano and land-owners there since 1506, when a Corelli moved to the area from Rome. Although apparently prosperous, they were almost certainly not of the nobility, as several fanciful accounts of the composer's genealogy subsequently claimed. Corelli's father, from whom he took the name Arcangelo, died five weeks before the composer's birth. Consequently, he was raised by his mother, Santa (née Ruffini, or Raffini), alongside four elder siblings.

The wealth of anecdotes and legends attached to Corelli contrast sharply with the paucity of reliable contemporary evidence documenting events in his life. This gap is especially pronounced for his formative years, including his musical education; traditional accounts of a highly idealized childhood have long been debunked.

Musical education
According to the poet Giovanni Mario Crescimbeni, who presumably knew the composer well, Corelli initially studied music under a priest in the nearby town of Faenza, and then in Lugo, before moving in 1666 to Bologna. A major centre of musical culture of the time, Bologna had a flourishing school of violinists associated with Ercole Gaibara and his pupils, Giovanni Benvenuti and Leonardo Brugnoli. Reports by later sources link Corelli's musical studies with several master violinists, including Benvenuti, Brugnoli, Bartolomeo Laurenti and Giovanni Battista Bassani. Although historically plausible, these accounts remain largely unconfirmed, as does the claim that the papal contralto Matteo Simonelli first taught him to write in the “Palestrina style”. A remark Corelli later made to a patron suggests that his musical education focused mainly on the violin.

Chronicles of the Accademia Filarmonica of Bologna indicate that Corelli was accepted as a member by 1670, at the exceptionally young age of seventeen. The credibility of this attribution has been disputed. Although the nickname Il Bolognese appears on the title-pages of Corelli's first three published sets of works (Opus 1 to 3), the duration of his stay in Bologna remains unclear.

Early career
Anecdotes of travels outside Italy to France, Germany, and Spain lack any contemporary evidence. For example, the anecdote that Corelli's continental fame stemmed from a trip to Paris at the age of nineteen, where he was chased away by an envious Jean-Baptiste Lully, seems to have originated with Jean-Jacques Rousseau. It was also claimed that Corelli spent time in Germany in the service of Maximilian II Emanuel, Elector of Bavaria (supposedly in 1681), as well as in the house of his friend and fellow violinist-composer Cristiano Farinelli (between 1680 and 1685).

Although it is unclear quite when Corelli arrived in Rome, he was certainly active there by 1675, when "Arcangelo Bolognese" (as he was referred to) was engaged to play as one of the supporting violinists in Lenten oratorios at the church of San Giovanni dei Fiorentini, as well as in the French national celebrations held each year on 25 August at San Luigi dei Francesi and during the ordination of a member of the powerful Chigi family at Santi Domenico e Sisto. In August 1676, he was already playing second violin to the renowned Carlo Mannelli at San Luigi dei Francesi. Although Rome did not have any permanent orchestra providing stable employment for instrumentalists, Corelli rapidly made a name for himself, playing in a variety of ensembles sponsored by wealthy patrons, such as Cardinal Benedetto Pamphili, for whom he played in Lenten oratorios at San Marcello from 1676 to 1679.

Professional success

In 1687 Corelli led the festival performances of music for Queen Christina of Sweden. He was also a favorite of Cardinal Pietro Ottoboni, grandnephew of another Cardinal Pietro Ottoboni, who in 1689 became Pope Alexander VIII. From 1689 to 1690 he was in Modena. The Duke of Modena was generous to him. In 1706 Corelli was elected a member of the Pontificia Accademia degli Arcadi (the Arcadian Academy of Rome). He received the Arcadian name of Arcomelo Erimanteo.

In 1708 he returned to Rome, living in the palace of Cardinal Ottoboni. His visit to Naples, at the invitation of the king, took place in the same year. The style of execution introduced by Corelli and preserved by his pupils, such as Francesco Geminiani, Pietro Locatelli, Pietro Castrucci, Francesco Antonio Bonporti, Giovanni Stefano Carbonelli, Francesco Gasparini, and others, was of vital importance for the development of violin playing. It has been said that the paths of all of the famous violinist-composers of 18th-century Italy led to Arcangelo Corelli, who was their "iconic point of reference".

However, Corelli used only a limited portion of his instrument's capabilities. This may be seen from his writings. The parts for violin very rarely proceed above D on the highest string, sometimes reaching the E in fourth position on the highest string. The story has been told and retold that Corelli refused to play a passage that extended to A in altissimo in the overture to Handel's oratorio The Triumph of Time and Truth (premiered in Rome, 1708).

Nevertheless, his compositions for the instrument mark an epoch in the history of chamber music. His influence was not confined to his own country: his works were key in the development of the music of an entire generation of composers, including Antonio Vivaldi, Georg Friedrich Handel, Johann Sebastian Bach and François Couperin, as well as many others. Bach studied the works of Corelli and based an organ fugue (BWV 579) on Corelli's Opus 3 of 1689. Handel's Opus 6 Concerti Grossi take Corelli's own older Opus 6 Concerti as models, rather than the later three-movement Venetian concerto of Antonio Vivaldi favoured by Bach.

Musical society in Rome also owed much to Corelli. He was received in the highest circles of the aristocracy, and for a long time presided at the celebrated Monday concerts in the palace of Cardinal Ottoboni.

Death
Corelli died in Rome in possession of a fortune of 120,000 marks and a valuable collection of works of art and fine violins, the only luxury in which he had indulged.  He left both to his benefactor and friend, who generously made over the money to Corelli's relatives. Corelli is buried in the Pantheon at Rome.

Works

Corelli's artistic figure flourished at the height of the Baroque, a cultural current characterized by an ornate and luxuriant artistic expressiveness, rich of strong contrasts. His music developed from the Renaissance polyphony, but was characterized by a transition towards greater independence between the voices. New socio-cultural and religious factors, as well as a strong influence of theater and rhetoric, led to the development of a renewed musical language that could better express the spirit of the time, thus developing a wide range of new harmonical, vocal and instrumental techniques. It is the period in which the tonal system is definitively consolidated, abandoning the old modal system, and which has its most typical expression in the writing style called continuo or ciphered bass, in which the bass line and the top line are written in full, leaving the execution of the harmonic filling attributed to the other parts to the discretion of the performer, indicated synthetically by the author by numbers. The great importance attributed to the superior voice, which relegated the other parts to a subordinate role, brought out the figure of the virtuoso soloist.

Despite the typically Baroque love for the extravagant, the bizarre, the asymmetrical and the dramatic, Corelli's production deviates from this scheme, favoring the classical principles of sobriety, symmetry, rationality, balanced and expressive moderation, as well as formal perfection, appreciated several times by coeval and contemporary critics, formulating an aesthetic that is among the beginners of the neoclassical school of music with considerable economy of means. In the description of the Larousse Encyclopedia of Music, "no doubt others before him showed more originality, but none in his day showed a more noble interest in balance and order, or in formal perfection and meaning. Despite his Bolognese training, he embodies the classical era of Italian music, thanks above all to the Roman tradition. [...] Although he did not invent the forms he used, Corelli gave them a nobility and perfection that make him one of the greatest classicists”.

Corelli's works were the result of long and thoughtful planning, and were published only after careful and multiple revisions. His latest collection seems to have taken more than thirty years to complete, and a statement he left in a letter of 1708 attests his insecurity: "After so many and extensive revisions I have rarely felt the confidence to deliver to the public the few compositions that I sent it to the press". Such a rigorous, rationally and organized method, and such a strong yearning for ideal perfection, are other characteristics that make him a classic in opposition to the wild, asymmetrical, irregular and improvisational spirit of the most typical Baroque. For Franco Piperno, "his printed work has an exceptionally well-kept and cohesive structure, deliberately designed to be didactic, modeling and monumental. It is no coincidence that one of the figures on the title page of his Opera Terza is written "to posterity", that is, as posterity would see him: as an authority on composition, execution and pedagogy, a source of full of potential ideas". He was rigid also in the choice of genres to deal with: the trio sonata, the sonata for solo instrument and the concerto grosso. All his production is for strings, with continuo accompaniment, which could be performed by a variable combination of organ, harpsichord, lutes or theorbos. He left no works for voice, but his compositions reveal a strong influence of vocal music in their expressiveness, as well as in the treatment of polyphony.

In his time, the circle of fifths established itself as the main driver of chord progressions and, according to Richard Taruskin, Corelli practiced, more than anyone of his generation, new concepts with expressive, dynamic and structural purposes, which was fundamental for the sedimentation of the tonal system. Manfred Bukofzer, likewise, states that "Arcangelo Corelli deserves credit for the full realization of tonality in the field of instrumental music. His works happily usher in the late Baroque period. [...] Although closely linked to counterpoint tradition of the ancient Bolognese school, Corelli handled the new language with impressive confidence. On the other hand, chromatisms are rare in his music, but dissonances are relatively common and used as an expressive element, although they are always well prepared and well resolved. Critics have also highlighted the harmonious and balanced integration between polyphonic and homophonic elements, with polyphony which unfolds freely within a tonal structure. In his work there is an abundance of polyphonic expressive forms, the fugati, simple counterpoints and imitative writings, with themes that are repeated in succession by the various voices alternately, usually also called fugues, but in his style authentic fugues are rare, as his development differs from conventional models because of form, exhibiting a wide variety of solutions. According to Pincherle, one of the most significant aspects of Corelli's genius lies in the coordinated movement of these voices that intertwine, avoid each other and find themselves in such a way as to develop ever-changing motifs, establishing a unity through the motivic kinship of the different movements, a method which Fausto Torrefranca compared to the creation of "a frieze that runs along the walls and facades of a temple".

Among his influences are mainly the masters of the Bolognese school, such as Giovanni Benvenuti, Leonardo Brugnoli and Giovanni Battista Bassani. Also evident is the influence of Jean-Baptiste Lully, attested by Francesco Geminiani, as well as by the Venetian school, in particular Francesco Cavalli, Antonio Cesti and Giovanni Legrenzi. George J. Buelow, further, attests that the influence of Palestrina on the development of the polyphonic style of his music has been largely ignored, an influence received mainly through his teacher Simonelli, who was a singer of the Sistine Chapel, where Palestrina's work was one of the highlights of the repertoire.

Corelli’s style has long been praised as paradigmatic for its clarity and its sober and expressive melodism, the quintessence of Arcadian good taste. Georg Friedrich Handel, Johann Sebastian Bach, Antonio Vivaldi, Giuseppe Torelli, Georg Muffat, Georg Philipp Telemann, Giuseppe Valentini, Benedetto Marcello, Pietro Locatelli, Giuseppe Sammartini, Francesco Geminiani and countless other musicians were inspired by the Corellian model in producing their orchestral music. In Rome its influence was so overwhelming that no composer of the next generation could completely avoid it. Along with Torelli and Vivaldi, Corelli was one of the key figures in establishing the concerto as a genre whose popularity still persists today.

An 1827 music dictionary still echoed what Burney had said more than thirty years earlier: "Corelli's concerts have withstood all the onslaught of time and fashion, more firmly than his other works. Harmony is so pure, the parts so clearly, judiciously and ingeniously arranged, and the overall effect, played by a large orchestra, is so majestic, solemn and sublime, that they disarm any criticism and make one forget everything that has ever been composed in the same genre". In the opinion of Michael Talbot, writing for The Cambridge Companion to the Concerto, it is difficult to explain the enduring popularity of this collection, considering the semplicity not the cause of its popularity, but only a precondition. He continues stating:

Corelli composed 48 trio sonatas, 12 violin and continuo sonatas, and 12 concerti grossi.

Six sets of twelve compositions, published between 1888 and 1891 by Chrysander, are authentically ascribed to Corelli, together with a few other works.
 Opus 1: 12 sonate da chiesa (trio sonatas for 2 violins and continuo) (Rome 1681)
 Opus 2: 12 sonate da camera (trio sonatas for 2 violins and continuo) (Rome 1685)
 Opus 3: 12 sonate da chiesa (trio sonatas for 2 violins and continuo) (Rome 1689)
 Opus 4: 12 sonate da camera (trio sonatas for 2 violins and continuo) (Rome 1694)
 Opus 5: 12 Suonati a violino e violone o cimbalo (6 sonate da chiesa and 6 sonate da camera for violin and continuo) (Rome 1700) The last sonata is a set of variations on La Folia.
 Opus 6: 12 concerti grossi (8 concerti da chiesa and 4 concerti da camera for concertino of 2 violins and cello, string ripieno, and continuo) (written in the 1680s, publ. Amsterdam 1714)
 op. post.: Sinfonia in D minor, WoO 1
 op. post.: Sonata a Quattro, WoO 2 (Rogers, Amsterdam, 1699)
 op. post.: Sonata a Quattro, WoO 3 (Rogers, Amsterdam, 1699 – incomplete/dubious)
 op. post.: Sonata a Quattro for Trumpet, 2 Violins & B.C, WoO 4
 op. post.: 6 Sonate a tre, WoO 5–10 (Amsterdam 1714)

Legacy

His concerti grossi have often been popular in Western culture. For example, a portion of the Christmas Concerto, Op. 6 No. 8, is in the soundtrack of the film Master and Commander: The Far Side of the World, and Corelli's Op. 6 No. 2 also provided the theme for Sir Michael Tippett's Fantasia Concertante on a Theme of Corelli. British composer E. Florence Whitlock composed Variations on a Theme by Corelli for violin in 1968.

Notes and references

Notes

References

Bibliography

 Piancastelli, Carlo (in Italian) Fusignano ad Arcangelo Corelli: nel secondo centenario dalla morte 1913, Bologna, Stabilimento poligrafico emiliano, 1914 [Reprinted 2011, Nabu Press ]
 Pincherle, Marc, Corelli et son Temps Paris, Félix Alcan, 1933. [Translated, Russell, Hubert E M (1956) Corelli: His Life, His Work. New York.  Reprinted 1968, The Norton Library, and 1979, Da Capo Press]
 
 Philippe Borer, The Sweet Power of Strings: reflections on the musical idea of dolce, in Exploring Virtuosities, ed. by Ch. Hoppe, Hildesheim, Olms, 2018, pp. 211–240

External links

 
 Video of excerpts from Corelli's Christmas Concerto performed on original instruments by the ensemble Voices of Music using baroque instruments, ornamentation and playing techniques.

Free sheet music
Corelli, Arcangelo, scores for complete opp. 1–6, Center for Computer Assisted Research in the Humanities (CCARH) at Stanford University

1653 births
1713 deaths
17th-century classical composers
17th-century Italian composers
18th-century classical composers
18th-century Italian composers
18th-century Italian male musicians
Burials at the Pantheon, Rome
Composers for violin
Italian Baroque composers
Italian male classical composers
Italian classical violinists
Male classical violinists
Musicians from Bologna
People from the Province of Ferrara
People from the Province of Ravenna
17th-century male musicians